Duane Whitney Martin (January 2, 1940 – July 3, 1966) was an American Air Force officer and prisoner of war during the Vietnam War.

Biography
Martin was born on January 2, 1940, in Denver, Colorado. He became a commissioned officer in the United States Air Force in 1963 and completed his helicopter training in 1964.

In 1965, Martin was assigned to Detachment 1 38th Aerospace Rescue and Recovery Squadron (38th ARRS), based at Nakhon Phanom Royal Thai Air Force Base, Thailand. On September 20, 1965, Captain Thomas J. Curtis, Martin, Sergeant William A. Robinson crew chief, and Pararescue Specialist (PJ) Arthur Black took off in their Kaman HH-43 Huskie BuNo 62-4510, callsign Dutchy 41 on a combat search and rescue (CSAR) mission for Essex 04, an F-105D piloted by Capt Willis E. Forby, over North Vietnam. The HH-43 was hit by ground fire and crashed in the jungle.

Curtis, Robinson, and Black were all captured by the North Vietnamese Army and taken to a POW camp in North Vietnam. They were later released during Operation Homecoming. Martin, on the other hand was captured by the Pathet Lao and taken to a POW camp in Laos. There, he joined fellow prisoners Eugene DeBruin (American), Phisit Intharathat, Prasit Promsuwan, Prasit Dhanee (all Thai), and Y.C. To (Chinese), who had all been crewmembers on an Air America flight that was shot down in 1963. They were joined in February 1966 by Dieter Dengler.

After learning that the starving Pathet Lao guards planned on killing them and staging their bodies so that the killings looked like an escape, the prisoners decided to attempt an escape. On June 29, 1966, while the guards were eating, the group slipped out of their hand and foot restraints and grabbed the guard's unattended weapons. The Pathet Lao guards spotted some of the other prisoners trying to escape. Dengler fired at a machete wielding guard and Phisit Intharathat killed the other guards. Phisit, in his own account, says he killed one guard as he reached for his rifle and says three in total were killed and the rest ran away. The seven prisoners split into three groups: Dengler and Martin, who headed for the Mekong River to escape to Thailand; Phisit and the two other Thai prisoners; and DeBruin stayed with To, who had been too ill to continue with the escape.

Several days after escaping, Martin and Dengler were hiding out near an Akha village. Martin had a bout of malaria and was severely weakened. He was further demoralized when an attempt to signal a C-130 flareship that came over them produced no results. He told Dengler that he was going to die. Later that day, he told Dengler that he was going to try to steal some food from the village. Dengler told him it would be suicide, but accompanied him on the venture. As they neared the village, they encountered a boy playing with a dog. The boy alerted the village of their presence and a villager came running toward them with a machete. Martin knelt down on the trail with his hands clasped before him in supplication, but the man swung at Martin, hitting him in the leg. A second swing struck Martin in the back of the neck, killing him. Dengler managed to escape back into the jungle and was rescued several weeks later. Other than Dengler, Phisit Intharathat is the only known survivor of the escape. The rest of the prisoners are still unaccounted for.

In the 2007 film Rescue Dawn, which told the story from Dengler's point of view, Martin was portrayed by actor Steve Zahn.

See also

Little Dieter Needs to Fly
Rescue Dawn
Air America (airline)
Air America (film)

References

Further reading

External links
Duane Martin biography

1940 births
1966 deaths
United States Air Force officers
Shot-down aviators
Vietnam War prisoners of war
American military personnel killed in the Vietnam War
United States Air Force personnel of the Vietnam War